Woncheuk (613–696) was a Korean Buddhist monk who did most of his writing in China, though his legacy was transmitted by a disciple to Silla. One of the two star pupils of Xuanzang, his works and devotion to the translation projects was revered throughout China and Korea, even reaching Chinese rulers like Emperors Taizong and Gaozong of Tang and Empress Wu of Zhou. His exegetical work was also revered and greatly influenced Tibetan Buddhism and the greater Himalayan region.

Woncheuk was a follower of Paramārtha (499-569) and the Shelun school (攝論宗) of Yogacara. This school defended the view that there was a ninth consciousness called the "pure consciousness" (amalavijñāna), as opposed to just the eight consciousnesses of orthodox Yogacara. This position had been rejected by Xuanzang and Kuiji.

Nomenclature, orthography and etymology

The Zhengzhang Shangfang reconstruction of the Middle Chinese pronunciation of his name is 圓測 /ɦˠiuᴇnťʃʰɨk̚/.

Biography
Korean born, he lived at Xi Ming Temple and studied at the commencement of the Tang dynasty with the great translator and exponent of Yogacara, the well-travelled Xuanzang. Through Xuanzang's tutelage, he focused upon the study of the Yogacara doctrine. Woncheuk authored commentaries on early Indian and Mahayana literature. Woncheuk died in China, in a temple in Loyang.  Woncheuk is well known amongst scholars of Tibetan Buddhism and the Himalaya for his Commentary on the Saṃdhinirmocana sūtra. While in Tang China, Woncheuk took as a disciple a Korean-born monk named Dojeung, who travelled to Silla in 692 and propounded and propagated Woncheuk's exegetical tradition there where it flourished.

Choo (2006: p. 125) holds that though the Heart Sutra is generally identified as within the auspice of the Second Turning of the Dharmacakra (Sanskrit), Woncheuk in his commentary provides an exegesis from the Third Turning: Woncheuk contributed to the development of the Dharmic discourse of  Essence-Function and Ekayāna.

Extant works
Choo (2006: p. 123) lists Woncheuk's three extant works, namely: 
the Commentary on the Heart Sutra, which is the first commentary on Xuanzang's translation of the Heart Sutra
the Commentary on the Samdhinirmocana-sutra, which is the largest extant commentary on that sutra—called “the Great Chinese Commentary” by the eminent Vajrayana scholar Je Tsongkhapa
the Commentary on the Benevolent King Sutra.

Notes

References
Choo, B. Hyun (2006). "An English Translation of the Banya paramilda simgyeong chan: Wonch'uk's Commentary on the Heart Sutra (Prajnaparamita-hrdaya-sutra)." cited in: International Journal of Buddhist Thought & Culture February 2006, Vol.6, pp. 121–205. 2006 International Association for Buddhist Thought & Culture. Source:  (accessed: February 2, 2009)
Chung, Byung Cho (1977). "Wonch'uk ui Banya Simgyeong Chan Yon-ku (The Study of Wonch'uk's Commentary on the Heart Sūtra)." The Journal of Korean Studies. No.9, Winter. Seoul: II Ji Sa.

7th-century Buddhists
7th-century Korean people
Korean emigrants to China
7th-century Korean philosophers
Korean scholars of Buddhism
Silla Buddhist monks
613 births
696 deaths
Yogacara